Daniel Wachsmann (born 1946) is an Israeli filmmaker, writer, producer and director, best known for his film, Hamsin.

Biography
Daniel Wachsmann was born in Shanghai, China.

Filmography

1974: My Father (Hebrew: אבי) – First Prize at the International Film Festival, Mannheim, Germany

1977: Eliora (Hebrew: אלוירה) – Citation at International Short Film Festival Oberhausen

1979: Transit (Hebrew: טרנזיט) – Formal competition at the 30th Berlin International Film Festival  
 
1980: Silver Rose (Hebrew: ורד הכסף)

1981: David's Violin (Hebrew: כינור דוד)

1982: Khamsin (Hebrew: חמסין) – Nominated in competition for Oscar Foreign Films; Silver Panther Prize at Locarno, Switzerland; Honorable Mention at Strasbourg; selected by Israeli film critics as the Film of the Decade

1986: Red Cow (Hebrew: פרה אדומה) – shown in international film festivals

1989: The Intended (Hebrew: המיועד) – Wolgin Prize, Jerusalem Film Festival; Cannes Film Festival; Shanghai International Film Festival

1996: Song of the Galil (Hebrew: שירת הגליל) – Golden Anchor Prize, Haifa International Film Festival; Silver Hugo Prize, Chicago International Film Festival

1997: The Stone and the Olive Tree (Hebrew: האבן ועץ הזית) – Documentary about the Intifada

1999: Menelik, the Black Jewish Prince (Hebrew: מנליק נסיך יהודי שחור) – New Century Prize, Jerusalem Film Festival

2000: Across From the Forests (Hebrew: מול היערות)

2002: Bar Mitzvah (Hebrew: בר מצווה)

2004: Letters from Rishikesh (Hebrew: מכתבים מרישיקש)

2018: Acre Dreams (עכו חלומות)

References

Israeli film directors
Living people
1946 births
Beit Zvi School for the Performing Arts alumni